John S. Lowe (born September 16, 1959) is an American politician serving as a member of the Nebraska Legislature from the 37th district. Elected in November 2016, he assumed office on January 4, 2017.

Early life and education 
Lowe was born in Kearney, Nebraska. He graduated from Kearney High School in 1978 and earned a bachelor's degree from Kearney State College in 1982.

Career 
Outside of politics, Lowe works as a real estate agent, specializing in commercial and farm properties. He was elected to the Nebraska Legislature in November 2016 and assumed office on January 4, 2017.

References 

1959 births
Living people
People from Kearney, Nebraska
Businesspeople from Nebraska
University of Nebraska at Kearney alumni
Republican Party Nebraska state senators